Nolok Babu is a Bangladeshi singer. He won the first CloseUp1 competition (an adaptation of Pop Idol), a TV show to decide the best new young singer based on voting and participation.

Early life
Nolok was born in Jamalpur. His family name was Farhad. He grew up in a poor family and struggled hard. He had no opportunity to get formal training. However, he got some assistance in Jamalpur Shilpakala academy (Musical Academy). His mother was the bread earner of his family, and when his mother very sick he collected funds by singing in trains.

In 2005, when CloseUp started Farhad registered his name as Nolok Babu.

Close Up1
In the selection round, he came into notice with "Sua Chan Pakhi", a popular song of late folk musician, Ukil Munsi. In the next rounds, he performed "Amar gaye joto dukkho soy", "Megh bhanga Rod", "Keno ei Nissongota", "Tara bhora rate" and "Ma go Bhabna keno".

Solo albums

Dui Chokher Kadon (2008)
Amar Maje Bilin Tumi
 Bhalobasar Durbhikkho
 Dui Chokher Kandon
 Dukkho Debe Kare
 Eto Bhalo Mon
 Eto Rup Onge
 Keu Base Na
 Koto Jontrona Kine Kine
 Matire Mati
 Naire Porokaal
 Nijer Kadhe Nijer Lash
 Oporadhi

She Je Konya Bhalo (2006)

 Ami Tomay Pabo
 Jar Shonge Chilona Porichoy
 Maa Re Behest Tumi
 Mon Pakhi
 O Amar Chokhu Nai
 Oi Durer Gaye
 Ontorer Bhitor
 Prem Jare Khuje Fere
 She Je Konna Bhalo
 Shopno Maye

Criticism
Nolok was criticized for his rapid change of lifestyle and rude behaviour. 
In 2007 he beat a passer-by in the street and was jailed for few days.
In 2013 Nolok was handed over to police for misbehaviour with an air hostess.

References

External links
 Nolok Babu's Official Site
 Train singer becomes Bangladesh Idol

Living people
Year of birth missing (living people)
21st-century Bangladeshi male singers
21st-century Bangladeshi singers